Patulibacter brassicae  is a Gram-positive and aerobic bacterium from the genus of Patulibacter which has been isolated from rhizosphere soil from the plant Chinese cabbage in Shandong in China.

References

External links
Type strain of Patulibacter brassicae at BacDive -  the Bacterial Diversity Metadatabase

 

Actinomycetota
Bacteria described in 2016